S. William Rosenberg (March 10, 1916 – January 22, 1990) was an American politician who served in the New York State Assembly from 1961 to 1972.

References

1916 births
1990 deaths
Republican Party members of the New York State Assembly
20th-century American politicians